Buckingham is a constituency represented in the House of Commons of the UK Parliament since 2019 by Greg Smith, a Conservative.

History 
The Parliamentary Borough of Buckingham sent two MPs to the House of Commons after its creation in 1542. That was reduced to one MP by the Representation of the People Act 1867. The Borough was abolished altogether by the Redistribution of Seats Act 1885, and it was transformed into a large county division, formally named the North or Buckingham Division of Buckinghamshire. It was one of three divisions formed from the undivided three-member Parliamentary County of Buckinghamshire, the other two being the Mid or Aylesbury Division and the Southern or Wycombe Division.

In the twentieth century, the constituency was held by the Conservative Party for most of the time. However, Aidan Crawley, a Labour Party MP, served Buckingham from 1945 until 1951, and from 1964 until 1970, its Labour MP was the controversial publisher Robert Maxwell.

Before the periodic review effected in 1983, the new town of Milton Keynes, including its older parts such as Bletchley and Fenny Stratford, was in the constituency.  The 1983 review followed the previous national review in 1974 and recognised the large increase in voters in the constituency. The sitting Buckingham MP, William Benyon, stood for the newly created Milton Keynes constituency, where he was elected.  The residual seat was won in 1983 by Conservative George Walden. Walden retired in 1997, and John Bercow won the following general elections in 2001, 2005, 2010, 2015 and 2017. At the 2005 general election, this constituency had the Conservatives' highest numerical majority, although a higher share of the vote was achieved in Kensington and Chelsea in London, the constituency of Malcolm Rifkind, and Richmond in North Yorkshire, the constituency of William Hague.

In 2009, Bercow was elected as Speaker of the House of Commons following the resignation of Michael Martin. There is an inconsistently followed convention, which is mostly kept by the major parties, not to oppose a Speaker at election. Nonetheless, UKIP's leader, Nigel Farage, stood against Bercow in the 2010 election but finished third behind the Buckinghamshire Campaign for Democracy founder, who previously founded the Pro-Euro Conservative Party.

In both the 2015 and 2017 general elections, Bercow was challenged by only UKIP and the Green Party, with the addition of the independent candidate Scott Raven in the latter election. In September 2019 the Conservative Party announced their intention to stand a candidate against Bercow in the next election, breaking the convention of major parties not opposing a Speaker, seemingly in response to Bercow's opposition to Prime Minister Boris Johnson's handling of Brexit. However, Bercow announced in September 2019 that he would stand down as Speaker on either October 31 or at the next election, whichever occurred first.

Boundaries and boundary changes 

1885–1918: The Municipal Borough of Buckingham, the Sessional Divisions of Ashendon, Buckingham, Newport, and Stony Stratford, and part of the Sessional Division of Winslow.

1918–1950: The Municipal Borough of Buckingham, the Urban Districts of Bletchley, Linslade, and Newport Pagnell, the Rural Districts of Buckingham, Newport Pagnell, Stratford and Wolverton, Wing, and Winslow, and parts of the Rural Districts of Aylesbury and Long Crendon.

Gained Linslade and the Rural District of Wing from Aylesbury.

1950–1974:  The Municipal Borough of Buckingham, the Urban Districts of Bletchley, Linslade, Newport Pagnell, and Wolverton, and the Rural Districts of Buckingham, Newport Pagnell, Wing, and Winslow.

The parts of the Rural District of Aylesbury and the (former) Rural District of Long Crendon were transferred to the County Constituency of Aylesbury.  Other minor changes.

1974–1983:  The Municipal Borough of Buckingham, the Urban Districts of Bletchley, Newport Pagnell, and Wolverton, and the Rural Districts of Buckingham, Newport Pagnell, Wing, and Winslow.

Lost Linslade to the County Constituency of South Bedfordshire.  This Urban District of Linslade had been merged with that of Leighton Buzzard to form the Urban District of Leighton-Linslade, which was included in the Administrative County of Bedfordshire.

1983–1992:  The District of Aylesbury Vale wards of Bierton, Brill, Buckingham North, Buckingham South, Cheddington, Eddlesborough, Great Brickhill, Great Horwood, Grendon Underwood, Haddenham, Hogshaw, Long Crendon, Luffield Abbey, Marsh Gibbon, Newton Longville, Oakley, Pitstone, Quainton, Steeple Claydon, Stewkley, Stone, Tingewick, Waddesdon, Wing, Wingrave, and Winslow, and the Borough of Milton Keynes wards of Stony Stratford, Wolverton, and Wolverton Stacey Bushes.

Rural areas to the north and west of the town of Aylesbury transferred from the County Constituency thereof.  The area comprising the new District of Milton Keynes, except for Stony Stratford and Wolverton, formed the new County Constituency of Milton Keynes.

1992–1997:  For the 1992 general election, outside the normal cycle of periodic reviews by the Boundaries Commission, the Milton Keynes constituency was split in two, with Stony Stratford and Wolverton being included in the new Borough Constituency of Milton Keynes South West. No further changes.

1997–2010:  The District of Aylesbury Vale wards of Aston Clinton, Bierton, Brill, Buckingham North, Buckingham South, Cheddington, Eddlesborough, Great Brickhill, Great Horwood, Grendon Underwood, Haddenham, Hogshaw, Long Crendon, Luffield Abbey, Marsh Gibbon, Newton Longville, Oakley, Pitstone, Quainton, Steeple Claydon, Stewkley, Stone, Tingewick, Waddesdon, Wing, Wingrave, and Winslow.

The Aston Clinton ward was transferred from Aylesbury.

2010–present:  The Buckinghamshire Council wards of Buckingham North, Buckingham South, Eddlesborough, Gatehouse, Great Brickhill & Newton Longville, Great Horwood, Grendon Underwood & Brill, Haddenham & Stone, Long Crendon, Luffield Abbey, Marsh Gibbon, Oakfield & Bierton, Oakley, Pitstone & Cheddington, Quainton, Steeple Claydon, Stewkley, Tingewick, Waddesdon, Watermead, Weedon, Wing, Wingrave, Winslow, Icknield and The Risboroughs.

Princes Risborough transferred from Aylesbury, offset by the return of Aston Clinton.

The constituency takes up a large part of central Buckinghamshire, covering much of the Aylesbury Vale including the town of Buckingham, and some areas south of it, including Chequers, the official country residence of the Prime Minister since 1921. To the north, the remaining part of ceremonial Buckinghamshire forms two Borough of Milton Keynes constituencies (Milton Keynes South and Milton Keynes North).

Members of Parliament
Constituency created (1542)

MPs to 1660

MPs 1660–1868

MPs since 1868

Elections

Elections in the 2010s

Elections in the 2000s

Elections in the 1990s

Elections in the 1980s

Elections in the 1970s

Elections in the 1960s

Elections in the 1950s

Elections in the 1940s

Elections in the 1930s

Elections in the 1920s

Elections in the 1910s

Elections in the 1900s

Elections in the 1890s

Elections in the 1880s 

 Caused by Hubbard's elevation to the peerage, becoming Lord Addington.

Elections in the 1870s

Elections in the 1860s

Elections in the 1850s

 

 
 

 Caused by Temple-Nugent-Brydges-Chandos-Grenville's appointment as a Lord Commissioner of the Treasury.

Elections in the 1840s

 Caused by Fremantle's resignation by accepting the office of Steward of the Chiltern Hundreds

 Caused by Chetwode's death.

 Caused by Fremantle's appointment as Chief Secretary to the Lord Lieutenant of Ireland

 Caused by Fremantle's appointment as Secretary at War

Elections in the 1830s

See also
List of parliamentary constituencies in Buckinghamshire

Notes

References

Sources

External links 
nomis Constituency Profile for Buckingham — presenting data from the ONS annual population survey and other official statistics.

Parliamentary constituencies in Buckinghamshire
Constituencies of the Parliament of the United Kingdom established in 1542
Constituencies of the Parliament of the United Kingdom represented by a sitting Prime Minister
Buckingham